The Eurasian jay (Garrulus glandarius) is a species of passerine bird in the crow family Corvidae. It has pinkish brown plumage with a black stripe on each side of a whitish throat, a bright blue panel on the upper wing and a black tail. The Eurasian jay is a woodland bird that occurs over a vast region from western Europe and north-west Africa to the Indian subcontinent and further to the eastern seaboard of Asia and down into south-east Asia. Across this vast range, several distinct racial forms have evolved which look different from each other, especially when comparing forms at the extremes of its range.

The bird is called jay, without any epithets, by English speakers in Great Britain and Ireland.

Taxonomy and systematics

The Eurasian jay was formally described by the Swedish naturalist Carl Linnaeus in 1758 in the tenth edition of his Systema Naturae under the binomial name Corvus glandarius. Linnaeus specified the locality as "Europa" but this was restricted to Sweden by Ernst Hartert in 1903. The Eurasian jay is now one of three species placed in the genus Garrulus that was established in 1760 by the French zoologist Mathurin Jacques Brisson. The genus name Garrulus is a Latin word meaning "chattering", "babbling" or "noisy". The specific epithet glandarius is Latin meaning "of acorns".

Eight racial groups (33 subspecies in total) were recognised by Steve Madge & Hilary Burn in 1994: 
 the nominate group (nine European races), with a streaked .
 the cervicalis group (three races in North Africa), with a rufous nape, grey , very pale head sides, and a streaked or black crown.
 the atricapillus group (four races in Middle East, Crimea & Turkey), with a uniform mantle & nape, black crown and very pale face.
 the race hyrcanus (Caspian Hyrcanian mixed forests of Iran), small with black forecrown and broadly streaked hindcrown.
 the brandtii group (four races in Siberia and northern Japan), with a streaked crown, reddish head, dark iris and grey mantle.
 the leucotis group (two races in south-east Asia), with no white in the wing, a white forecrown, black hindcrown and much white on the sides of the head.
 the bispecularis group (six races in the Himalayan region), with an unstreaked rufous crown, and no white wing-patch.
 the japonicus group (four races in the southern Japanese islands), with a large white wing-patch, blackish face and scaled crown.

The International Union for Conservation of Nature (IUCN) and Birdlife International split the Eurasian jay into three species. The subspecies G. g. leucotis becomes the white-face jay (Garrulus leucotis) and the bispecularis group containing six subspecies becomes the plain-crowned jay (Garrulus bispecularis).

Description

The nominate race has light rufous brown to a pinkish brown body plumage. The whitish throat is bordered on each side by a prominent black moustache stripe. The forehead and crown are whitish with black stripes. The rump is white. The complex colouring on the upper surface of the wing includes black and white bars and a prominent bright blue patch with fine black bars. The tail is mainly black.

Voice

The most characteristic call is a harsh, rasping screech that is used upon sighting various predators and as a advertising call. The jay is well known for its mimicry, often sounding so like a different species that it is difficult to distinguish its true identity unless the bird is seen. It will imitate the calls of birds of prey such as the mew of the common buzzard and the cackle of the northern goshawk.

Distribution and habitat
A member of the widespread jay group, it inhabits mixed woodland, particularly with oaks, and is a habitual acorn hoarder. In recent years, the bird has begun to migrate into urban areas, possibly as a result of continued erosion of its woodland habitat. Before humans began planting the trees commercially on a wide scale, Eurasian jays were the main source of movement and propagation for the European oak (Q. robur), each bird having the ability to spread more than a thousand acorns each year. Eurasian jays will also bury the acorns of other oak species, and have been cited by the National Trust as a major propagator of the largest population of holm oak (Q. ilex) in Northern Europe, situated in Ventnor on the Isle of Wight. Jays have been recorded carrying single acorns as far as 20 km, and are credited with the rapid northward spread of oaks following the last ice age.

Behaviour and ecology

Breeding
Eurasian jays normally first breed when two years of age, although they occasionally breed when only one year. Very occasionally the nest is located on a building. The nest has a base of twigs  in diameter and a lining of thinner twigs, roots, grass, moss and leaves. The eggs are laid daily, normally early in the morning. The clutch is 3–6 eggs which are pale green to pale olive brown and are covered with fine darker speckles. They sometimes have brown or black streaks concentrated at the broader end. They are incubated by the female and hatch after 16–19 days. While the female is on the nest the male brings her food. Both parents feed and care for the young which fledge after 19–23 days. The parents continue to feed the fledgelings until they are 6–8 weeks of age. Only a single brood is raised each year.

The maximum recorded age is 16 years and 9 months for a bird in Skelton, York, United Kingdom, that was ringed in 1966 and found dead in 1983.

Diet

Feeding in both trees and on the ground, it takes a wide range of invertebrates including many pest insects, acorns (oak seeds, which it buries for use during winter), beech and other seeds, fruits such as blackberries and rowan berries, young birds and eggs, bats, and small rodents. Like most species, the jay's diet changes with the seasons but is noteworthy for its prolific caching of food—especially oak acorns and beechnuts—for winter and spring. While caching occurs throughout the year, it is most intense in the autumn.

Health

In order to keep its plumage free from parasites, it lies on top of anthills with spread wings and lets its feathers be sprayed with formic acid.

Intelligence
Similar to other corvids, Eurasian jays have been reported to plan for future needs. Male Eurasian jays also take into account the desires of their partner when sharing food with her as a courtship ritual and when protecting food items from stealing conspecifics.

References

Cited sources

Further reading

External links

 The Royal Society for the Protection of Birds (RSPB) - Birds & Wildlife - Jay
 Ageing and sexing by Javier Blasco-Zumeta & Gerd-Michael Heinze (PDF; 1.1 MB)
 Feathers of Eurasian jay (Garrulus glandarius)
 Jay photos and information 
 
 
 
 
 
 Eurasian jay media from ARKive

Garrulus
Birds of Eurasia
Birds of the Himalayas
Birds described in 1758
Taxa named by Carl Linnaeus